Casbeno (Lombard: Casben) is a neighborhood of the city of Varese. Located in the south of the city, overlooking Lake Varese, before the formation of the province of Varese, in the twenties, was the lower limit of the town itself. Initially rural fraction of the city, sees since the sixties a period of growth, which continues to this day: Casbeno currently has about 4,000 inhabitants, called Casbenàt in Lombard language.

Despite the limited area, Casbeno is home of several administrative offices: around Piazzale Libertà there is the provincial police headquarters (Questura di Varese) and the official headquarters of the Province. The prefect and the Province of Varese, located at Villa Recalcati, with the adjoining park are an example of the '800 architecture. Artistically relevant to Casbeno are also the parish church of San Vittore  and the sanctuary of Schirannetta (first construction dates back to 1200), carefully restored in the 60's by Giovanni Macchi, after the neglect of the past centuries had reduced in conditions of ruin. The architect Simone Cantoni built instead neoclassical Villa Recalcati in 1778.

In the neighbourhood, there is the station of Varese Casbeno, on the railway Milan-Saronno-Laveno.

References

Varese